Frank Benjamin Douglas (March 12, 1909 – December 4, 1985) was an American football player and coach of football and basketball. He served as the head football coach at Grinnell College in Grinnell, Iowa from 1940 to 1941 and again in 1946 and at Colorado College in Colorado Springs, Colorado in 1947, compiling a career college football coaching record of18–17. Douglas played college football at Grinnell from 128 to 1930 and then professionally for one season, in 1933, with the Brooklyn Dodgers of the National Football League (NFL). Douglas was also the head basketball coach at Cornell College in Mount Vernon, Iowa from 1931 to 1932, Grinnell from m 1940 to 1942, and the Missouri School of Mines and Metallurgy—now known as Missouri University of Science and Technology—from 1949 to 1950.

Head coaching record

College football

References

External links
 

1909 births
1985 deaths
American football halfbacks
Basketball coaches from Iowa
Brooklyn Dodgers (NFL) players
College men's track and field athletes in the United States
College track and field coaches in the United States
Colorado College Tigers athletic directors
Colorado College Tigers football coaches
Cornell Rams men's basketball coaches
Grinnell Pioneers men's basketball coaches
Grinnell Pioneers football coaches
Grinnell Pioneers football players
High school football coaches in Iowa
High school football coaches in Missouri
Iowa Hawkeyes football coaches
Iowa Hawkeyes men's basketball coaches
Missouri S&T Miners football coaches
Missouri S&T Miners men's basketball coaches
Sportspeople from Cedar Rapids, Iowa
Sportspeople from Denver
Players of American football from Iowa
Players of American football from Denver